The 2023 Super Rugby Pacific Season (known as Harvey Norman Super Rugby Pacific in Australia, Shop N Save Super Rugby Pacific in Fiji and DHL Super Rugby Pacific in New Zealand) is the 28th season of Super Rugby, an annual rugby union competition organised by SANZAAR between teams from Australia, Fiji, New Zealand and a combined team from Samoa, Tonga and other Pacific Island nations. The tournament will follow a similar schedule to the 2022 season, with 84 matches played in a round-robin, followed by finals in a knockout format. The season is expected to run from Friday 24 February 2023, culminating in a final to be played on Saturday 24 June, before the start of the 2023 mid-year international window.

The Fijian Drua, who were based in Australia for the 2022 season due to complications surrounding the COVID-19 pandemic, opened their permanent home base in Nadi, Fiji ahead of the 2023 season. In 2023, the team will play its home games at Churchill Park in Lautoka and HFC Bank Stadium in Suva.  will continue to be based in Auckland, New Zealand, but will play a match at Apia Park in Samoa in 2023. The Waratahs will also have a new home venue in 2023, moving to the newly built Allianz Stadium.

Competition format

Similarly to the 2022 season, the 12 participating teams will each play 14 regular season games: 7 home games and 7 away games, although the 2023 season will once again feature a Super Round, during which all teams will play their round 2 games at AAMI Park in Melbourne. All six fixtures of Round 2 will be held at the stadium between Friday 3 March and Sunday 5 March. The 14 games include 11 round-robin games against the other participating teams and 3 additional "rivalry" games (derby matches), in which they play another team for the second time in a home-and-away format. Each team will also have one bye week. 

The teams will be ranked 1 to 12 on one competition table based on competition points earned during the regular season. The top eight teams at the conclusion of the regular season will qualify for the play-offs. In the quarter-finals, the first-ranked team plays the eighth-ranked team, the second-ranked team plays the seventh-ranked, the third-ranked plays the sixth-ranked and the fourth-ranked team plays the fifth-ranked. The quarter-final winners progress to the semi-finals, and the winners of the semi-finals advance to the final. The higher ranked team will host each play-off match.

Standings

Round-by-round

The table below shows each team's progression throughout the season. For each round, their cumulative points total is shown with the overall log position in brackets:

Matches

The fixtures for the 2023 Super Rugby Pacific competition were released on 25 September 2022.

Finals
The finals fixtures are as follows:

Statistics

Leading point scorers

Source: Points

Leading try scorers

Source: Tries

Discipline

Players

Squads

The following squads have been named. Players listed in italics denote non-original squad members:

Referees
The following referees were selected to officiate the 2023 Super Rugby Pacific season:

References

External links
 Super Rugby websites:
 SANZAAR Super Rugby
 Australia Super Rugby
 New Zealand Super Rugby

2023
2023 in Australian rugby union
2023 in Fijian rugby union
2023 in New Zealand rugby union
2023 in Samoan rugby union
2023 in Tongan rugby union
2023 rugby union tournaments for clubs
 
Super Rugby Pacific